The Medford Carnegie Library is a two-story library building located in Medford, Oregon, United States.  The building was erected in 1911 (completed in 1912) as a gift from Andrew Carnegie. The Carnegie Library building was vacated in 2004 when all services were moved to a new library building in downtown Medford.

Throughout 2009, the building was occupied by various city offices while renovations were being completed on the existing Medford city hall building. The city spent about $210,000 to have Grants Pass-based Ausland Builders Inc. refurbish about an eighth of the 16,000-square-foot structure to make way for the temporary office space in the old children's book section. The work involved seismic upgrades, insulation, new windows and ceilings.

After City Hall renovations were complete city offices relocated back and further restoration efforts continued on the Carnegie Building.  To date, nearly $1 million in renovations have been made to the building.  The city awarded an $800,000 construction bid to S&B James Construction, based in White City, to replace the library's windows and overhaul its heating and air cooling system.  The construction money came from various Oregon Department of Energy grants and federal stimulus dollars.

See also
Carnegie library

References

Library buildings completed in 1912
National Register of Historic Places in Jackson County, Oregon
Carnegie libraries in Oregon
Former library buildings in the United States
Buildings and structures in Medford, Oregon
1911 establishments in Oregon
Historic district contributing properties in Oregon
Libraries established in 1911
Libraries on the National Register of Historic Places in Oregon